Ceriana mime is a species of syrphid fly in the family Syrphidae.

References

Eristalinae
Articles created by Qbugbot
Insects described in 1935
Taxa named by Frank Montgomery Hull
Diptera of North America
Hoverflies of North America